Edith Margaret Garrud (née Williams; 1872–1971) was a British martial artist, suffragist and playwright. She was the first British female teacher of jujutsu and one of the first female martial arts instructors in the western world.

Garrud was introduced to jujutsu in 1899 alongside her husband William; they studied under Sadakazu Uyenishi and she later opened her own London dojo. A supporter of women's suffrage, Garrud joined the Women's Freedom League in 1906 where she set up a self-defence club. To advertise how women could benefit from jujitsu, Garrud wrote fictional self-defence scenarios for magazines that she sometimes staged as suffrage theatre performance with costumes and props.

Garrud is best remembered for training the Bodyguard unit of the Women's Social and Political Union in jujutsu self-defence techniques to protect their leaders from arrest and from violence from members of the public. Garrud is credited with forging the image of the militant suffrage campaigner trained in hand-to-hand combat that came to represent the militants’ struggle for the vote.

Life 
Edith Margaret Williams was born in 1872 in Bath, Somerset. After being raised in Wales she pursued her education in England where she trained as a physical culture instructor for girls. In 1892, she met William Garrud, a fellow instructor, specialised in boxing and wrestling, at a class he was giving. They married the following year, and moved to London, where William worked as a physical culture trainer for universities.

In 1899, the Garruds were introduced to the art of jujutsu by witnessing a demonstration by Edward William Barton-Wright, an Englishman who had studied Shinden Fudo Ryu jujutsu and Kodokan judo  while living in Kobe, Japan between 1893 and 1897. Barton-Wright promoted jujitsu and other martial arts via music hall exhibitions and tournaments. He was also the founder of Bartitsu, a "New Art of Self Defence", and the owner of The Bartitsu School of Arms and Physical Culture. Barton-Wright's school, where he offered self-defence classes for men and women, was the first known Japanese martial arts' school in Europe. The Garruds trained under the school's jujutsu instructors Yukio Tani and Sadakazu Uyenishi, two experienced martial artists whom Barton-Wright had brought from Japan. After the Bartitsu school closed in 1902, the Garruds continued training under Uyenishi at his own Golden Square dojo The School of Japanese Self-Defence. At the end of 1908 Uyenishi decided to return to Japan, and the Garruds took over the dojo from him, becoming instructors. Edith Garrud continued giving lessons to women and children while William taught the men. A year later Edith opened her own dojo, The School of Ju-jutsu, at Argyll Place. Edith became the first British female teacher of jujutsu, and one of the first female martial arts instructors in the Western world.

As a supporter of women's suffrage, Garrud joined the Women's Freedom League (WFL) in 1906. In order to advertise the benefits of jujutsu specifically for women's personal protection, the Garruds took to the stage in music hall exhibitions and public demonstrations. During some of their performances, William dressed as a police officer while Edith played a suffragette campaigner that he tried unsuccessfully to arrest. As her renown grew, Edith was featured in 1907 as the protagonist in a short film entitled The Lady Athlete; or, Jiu-Jitsu Downs the Footpads, which was produced by the Gaumont British Picture Corporation and directed by Alf Collins. In 1908 she was appointed head of the Women's Athletic Society, the WFL athletics branch.

In May 1909 the militant Women's Social and Political Union's (WSPU) organised a "Woman's Exhibition" at the Prince's Skating Rink in Knightsbridge where Edith was invited to perform a jujutsu exhibition. After explaining jujutsu principles and techniques, she invited audience members to test her skill. The volunteers famously included a sceptical male police officer who ended up subjected to a shoulder throw. WSPU activists, known as "suffragettes", frequently faced violence during their campaigning work and Garrud, as a renowned martial arts performer and instructor, was approached by WSPU leader Emmeline Pankhurst and asked to train their members. In response Garrud instituted a twice-weekly Suffragettes' Self-Defence Club at her dojo, exclusively for WSPU members and advertised in the  organisation's official newspaper Votes for Women.  In late 1909 an article in Health and Strength, a physical-culture journal, used the mocking inflammatory title "Ju-jutsuffragettes: New Terror of the Police" in a report about Garrud's Self-Defence classes. Garrud was keen for her training not be seen as an encouragement to attack police officers, but rather as a means for women to defend themselves against assaults. In an article written in response entitled "The ju-jutsu suffragettes: Mrs Garrud replies to her critics",  published in Health & Strength, she emphasised that "policemen, on the whole, are the greatest friends and admirers the woman suffragette has" and asked to look after them and "resent any impertinence offered to them". That same year, in an essay for Votes for Women, Garrud outlined her vision for female empowerment gained through martial arts:

On 23 July 1910 Health and Strength published Damsel v. Desperado, a self-defence scenario written by Garrud. The fictional story featured a diminutive lady in a deserted street who sees off an attack by two male assailants with blocks, holds and throws. As her fame grew she was represented in a satirical cartoon by Arthur Wallis Mills published in Punch, a drawing entitled The Suffragette that Knew Jiu-Jitsu. The Arrest portrayed a tiny lady flexing her muscles while surrounded by a crowd of terrified police officers. Edith's play Damsel v. Desperado was reprinted alongside the cartoon at the request of Punch's editor. On 6 July 1910, the illustrated The Sketch published an article entitled "If you want to earn some time throw a policeman!". It featured Edith, in a traditional Edwardian dress and hat, using jujutsu on a police officer, played by her husband William, similar to the routine they did on stage.

In 1911, Health & Strength announced a new Suffrage drama choreographed by Garrud and rehearsed at her dojo. The play entitled Ju-Jutsu as a Husband-Tamer: A Suffragette Play with a Moral featured a costermonger’s wife taming her drunken husband into subjection after he attacked her, using her jujutsu skills and mastery of self-defence. The article was illustrated with photographs of Garrud performing the techniques from the play. For historian Wendy Rouse "The idea that such training could empower women to defend themselves against domestic violence, the most personal and most common form of violence and oppression of women, represented women's hope in dismantling the patriarchal power structure". In January 1911, Garrud choreographed the fight scenes for a polemic play entitled What Every Woman Ought to Know. During the celebration of the coronation of King George V on 22 June 1911, Edith led the procession of the athletics division of the WFL through London. From 1911, in response to increased demand, Garrud moved her Suffragettes' Self-Defence Club to the Palladium Academy, a dance school in Argyll Street.

Training the WSPU's Bodyguard 

In 1913, the Asquith-led government instituted the so-called Cat and Mouse Act whereby suffragette leaders on hunger strikes could legally be released from jail in order to recover at home before being re-arrested to complete their sentences.  The WSPU responded by establishing a thirty-member, all-woman protection unit known within the WSPU as "the Bodyguard". Its role was to protect WSPU leader Pankhurst from re-arrest under the Cat and Mouse Act. The WPSU leaders started advising all women in the movement to train in self-defence. Newspaper reports called them the "Jiujitsuffragettes", and the "Amazons". Garrud became the trainer of the Bodyguard, teaching them jujutsu and the use of Indian clubs as defensive weapons. Their lessons took place in a succession of secret locations to avoid the attention of the police.

The Bodyguard fought a number of well-publicised hand-to-hand combats with police officers who were attempting to arrest Pankhurst, most famously during the so-called "Battle of Glasgow" on 9 March 1914 and during the WSPU "Raid on Buckingham Palace" on 24 May 1914.

On several occasions they were also able to stage successful escapes and rescues, making use of tactics such as disguise and the use of decoys to confuse the police.  A number of these incidents are described in the unpublished memoir of Bodyguard member Katherine "Kitty" Marshall, titled Suffragette Escapes and Adventures.  Journalists coined the term "suffrajitsu" – a portmanteau of "suffragette" and "jujitsu" – to describe their techniques of self-defence, sabotage and subterfuge.

The Bodyguard was disbanded shortly after the onset of the First World War, as Pankhurst had decided to suspend militant suffrage actions and to support the British government in the war effort. When the conflict ended in 1918, women over thirty were given the vote, effectively ending the suffragist movement in Britain. Universal suffrage came a decade later.

Later life and legacy 

Edith and William Garrud continued to work as self-defence and jujutsu instructors until 1925, when they sold their school. They had at least two children, a son and a daughter. William Garrud died in 1960 at the age of 87. On 19 June 1965, on the occasion of her 94th birthday, Garrud was the subject of a feature article published in Woman magazine called "Dear Mrs. Garrud – I wish I’d Known You Then ...", during the interview she demonstrated on English journalist Godfrey Winn some of her joint locking techniques. She died in 1971 at the age of 99.

In a 2018 journal article, Mike Callan, Conor Heffernan and Amanda Spenn argued that although Garrud and the WSPU's employment of jujutsu was short-lived, her classes did "introduce women to new ideas about the possibilities for their gender and undermine assumed notions of their vulnerability" and contributed to the art becoming a part of the culture of the time, with a lasting significance demonstrated by supporters of Christabel Pankhurst's 1918 general election campaign in Smethwick using jujutsu against opponents.

Academic Simon Kelly wrote in a 2019 book chapter that "we know very little of [Garrud's] early years or later life", and that the limited sources available, such as magazine and newspaper articles, about Garrud and the Bodyguard has "created mystery ... which in recent years has taken on an almost folkloric quality as tales of a secret group of female martial arts fighters have circulated around news and social media".

Theatre and performance scholar Diana Looser wrote in 2011 that:

Portrayals in popular culture and commemorations 

The Year of the Bodyguard (1982), a docudrama for Britain's Channel 4 directed by Noel Burch featured a group of suffragettes escaping from the police after a window-smashing protest and taking refuge inside Edith Garrud's jujitsu school.

The Perfect Daughter (2002), a novel by Gillian Linscott, features a martial arts-oriented subplot with Edith Garrud as a supporting character.

Mrs Garrud's Dojo (2003), a play by Peter Hilton about Garrud's involvement with the suffragettes. 

 The One Show (2014): a short documentary about Garrud and presented by Honor Blackman was featured on the BBC One program. 

Suffrajitsu: Mrs. Pankhurst's Amazons (2015), a graphic novel trilogy in which Garrud makes a cameo appearance.

Suffragette (2015), a film directed by Sarah Gavron with Helena Bonham Carter. Bonham Carter modeled her performance after Garrud, even asking the filmmakers to change her character's name from Caroline to Edith. The film includes a scene in which her character teaches self-defence to a group of suffragettes. Bonham Carter said that Garrud, who could defend herself against men twice her weight and size, was a real inspiration for her character.

Enola Holmes (2020), a film directed by Harry Bradbeer where the titular character (whose mother Eudoria is played by Bonham Carter) is taught jujutsu by an instructor named Edith, played by Susie Wokoma.

On 30 June 2011, an Islington People's Plaque was placed outside Garrud's former home in Thornhill Square by the Islington London Borough Council, the words on the plaque read: "Edith Garrud 1872–1971. The suffragette that knew jiu-jitsu lived here". In 2013, Garrud was included in a sculpture in Finsbury Park bus and tube station.

Notes

References

Sources

Books

Websites

Journals

External links 
 Ju-Jitsu Downs the Footpads Short film produced by Gaumont British Picture Corporation featuring Edith Garrud. (IMDB listing)
 The World We Live In. Self Defence Garrud's martial arts manifesto in Votes for Women of 4 March 1910.
 Damsel v. Desperado Garrud's play in Health & Strength of 23 July 1910.
 Ju-Jutsu as a Husband-Tamer: A Suffragette Play with a Moral Garrud's one-act play described in Health & Strength of 8 April 1911.

1872 births
1971 deaths
English female martial artists
English jujutsuka
English suffragists
Feminism and history
People associated with physical culture
British women's rights activists